Juan Carlos Carbonell (born May 16, 1970), is a Chilean open wheel race-car driver.  Born in Santiago, he began racing in the Chilean Formula Three Championship in 1989–1994.  In 1995 he moved up to the Indy Lights, followed by the IMSA World Sports Car Series in 1996.  In late 1996, he started a single race in the Indy Racing League at Las Vegas Motor Speedway. In 2010 at 40 years of age he captured his first Chilean Formula Three Championship title.

Motorsports Career Results

American Open-Wheel
(key) (Races in bold indicate pole position)

IndyCar

References

1970 births
Chilean racing drivers
Living people
IndyCar Series drivers
Indy Lights drivers
Barber Pro Series drivers